Morghzar (also Romanized as Morghzār and Marghzār) is a village in Golestan Rural District, in the Central District of Jajrom County, North Khorasan Province, Iran. At the 2006 census, its population was 23, in 10 families.

References 

Populated places in Jajrom County